The 1994 African Women's Handball Championship was the eleventh edition of the African Women's Handball Championship, held in Tunisia from 5 to 17 November 1994. It acted as the African qualifying tournament for the 1995 World Women's Handball Championship.

Knockout stage

Bracket

Third place game

Final

Final ranking

External links
Results on todor66.com

1994 Women
African Women's Handball Championship
African Women's Handball Championship
African Women's Handball Championship
1994 in African handball
Women's handball in Tunisia
November 1994 sports events in Africa
1994 in African women's sport